Primera División de México (Mexican First Division) Clausura 2005 was the 2005 edition of Primera División de México, crowning Mexico's spring champion in football. América won the championship for the tenth time in its history and thus qualified for the CONCACAF Champions' Cup 2006.

Overview

Final standings (groups)

League table

Results

Top goalscorers 
Players sorted first by goals scored, then by last name. Only regular season goals listed.

Source: MedioTiempo

Playoffs

Bracket

Quarterfinals

3–3 on aggregate. Cruz Azul advanced for being the higher seeded team.

3–3 on aggregate. América advanced for being the higher seeded team.

4–4 on aggregate. Morelia advanced for being the higher seeded team.

Tecos won 4–1 on aggregate.

Semifinals

América won 6–2 on aggregate.

UAG won 2–1 on aggregate.

Finals

América won 7–4 on aggregate.

Relegation

References

Mexico
Clausura